Kaki Ae, or Tate, is a language with about 500 speakers, half the ethnic population, near Kerema, in Papua New Guinea. It was previously known by the foreign designation Raeta Tati.

Classification
Kaki Ae has been proposed to be related to the Eleman languages, but the connections appear to be loans. Søren Wichmann (2013) tentatively considers it to be a separate, independent group. Pawley and Hammarström (2018) treat Kaki Ae as a language isolate due to low cognacy rates with Eleman, and consider the few similarities shared with Eleman to be due to borrowed loanwords.

Distribution
Kaki Ae is spoken in Auri, Kupiano, Kupla, Lou , Ovorio, and Uriri villages in Central Kerema Rural LLG, Gulf Province.

Pronouns
The Kaki Ae pronouns are:
{|
! !!sg!!pl
|-
!1
|nao||nu'u
|-
!2
|ao||ofe
|-
!3
|era||era-he
|}

Phonology
(The forms kaki and tate of the name both derive from the rather pejorative Toaripi name for the people, Tati.)

Vocabulary
The following basic vocabulary words are from Brown (1973), as cited in the Trans-New Guinea database:

{| class="wikitable sortable"
! gloss !! Kaki Ae
|-
| head || aro
|-
| hair || uʔumo
|-
| ear || oʔi
|-
| eye || ere
|-
| nose || noʔi
|-
| tooth || huʔu
|-
| tongue || anara
|-
| leg || fera
|-
| louse || saruta
|-
| dog || evera
|-
| bird || mini
|-
| egg || mini umu
|-
| blood || ivare
|-
| bone || uki
|-
| breast || ame
|-
| tree || oproro
|-
| man || aru
|-
| woman || aʔu
|-
| sun || lare
|-
| moon || fuiya
|-
| water || haime
|-
| fire || aiyeʔi
|-
| stone || ere
|-
| name || iru
|-
| eat || muake
|-
| one || okiao
|-
| two || uʔungka
|}

Further reading
Clifton, John M. 1995. A grammar sketch of the Kaki Ae language. In: Albert J. Bickfield (ed.), Work Papers of the Summer Institute of Linguistics, University of North Dakota Session, 33–80. Grand Forks, North Dakota: SIL.
Wurm, S.A. editor. Some Endangered Languages of Papua New Guinea: Kaki Ae, Musom, and Aribwatsa. D-89, vi + 183 pages. Pacific Linguistics, The Australian National University, 1997.

References

Kaki Ae–Eleman languages
Language isolates of New Guinea
Languages of Gulf Province
Vulnerable languages